Ayesha Norrie (born 29 March 1997) is an Australian football (soccer) player, who currently plays for Brisbane Roar. She has previously played for Melbourne Victory and Perth Glory in the Australian W-League. She has represented Australia on the under-17 and under-20 national teams.

Club career

Brisbane Roar, 2013–2016
Norrie signed with Brisbane Roar in 2013. She made her debut on 9 November 2013 in a match against Canberra United. She made six appearances for the team during the 2013–14 W-League season. Brisbane finished in fourth place during the regular season with a  record earning a berth to the playoffs.

Returning to the Roar for the 2014–15 W-League season, Norrie made eight appearances for the team. The Roar finished in sixth place during the regular season with a  record. Norrie made 11 appearances for the team during the 2015–16 W-League season. Brisbane finished in fourth place during the regular season with a  record and advanced to the playoffs. During the semifinal match against regular season champions Melbourne City, Brisbane was defeated 5–4 in a penalty kick shootout after 120 minutes of regular and overtime produced no goals for either side.

Melbourne Victory, 2016–2017
In October 2016, Norrie joined Melbourne Victory.

Brisbane Roar, 2017–2018
On 22 September 2017, Norrie returned to Brisbane Roar.

LA Galaxy OC, 2018–2019
In May 2018, Norrie joined United Women's Soccer expansion club LA Galaxy OC ahead of their inaugural season.

Perth Glory, 2019–2020
Norrie returned to Australia, joining W-League club Perth Glory.

Gold Coast United, 2020–2021
In July 2020, Norrie joined Gold Coast United.

Brisbane Roar, 2021–
In September 2021, Norrie returned once again to Brisbane Roar, as part of coach's Garrath McPherson push to rely on local talent.

International career
Norrie has represented Australia on the under-17 and under-20 national teams.

See also

References

Further reading
 Grainey, Timothy (2012), Beyond Bend It Like Beckham: The Global Phenomenon of Women's Soccer, University of Nebraska Press, 
 Stewart, Barbara (2012), Women's Soccer: The Passionate Game, Greystone Books,

External links
 Brisbane Roar player profile
 Colorado Pride player profile
 

1997 births
Living people
Australian women's soccer players
Brisbane Roar FC (A-League Women) players
Melbourne Victory FC (A-League Women) players
A-League Women players
Women's association football midfielders